Bjørnstad is a Norwegian surname. Notable people with the surname include:

Hans Bjørnstad (1928–2007), Norwegian ski jumper
Henrik Bjørnstad (born 1979), Norwegian professional golfer
Jørgen Bjørnstad (1894–1942), Norwegian gymnast
Ketil Bjørnstad (born 1952), Norwegian pianist and composer
Olaf B. Bjørnstad (1931–2013), Norwegian former ski jumper
Olav Bjørnstad (1882–1963), Norwegian rower
Tor Halvor Bjørnstad (born 1978), Norwegian cross-country skier
Vidar Bjørnstad (born 1955), Norwegian politician for the Labour Party

Norwegian-language surnames